Down with Love is a 2003 American romantic comedy film directed by Peyton Reed. It stars Renée Zellweger and Ewan McGregor and is a pastiche of the early-1960s American "no-sex sex comedies", such as Pillow Talk and Lover Come Back (both starring Rock Hudson, Doris Day, and Tony Randall) and the "myriad spawn" of derivative films that followed; Time film critic Richard Corliss wrote that Down with Love "is so clogged with specific references to a half-dozen Rock-and-Doris-type comedies that it serves as definitive distillation of the genre." Randall himself plays a small role in Down with Love, "bestowing his sly, patriarchal blessing" on the film, which also stars David Hyde Pierce (in the neurotic best friend role often played by Randall or Gig Young), Sarah Paulson, Rachel Dratch, Jeri Ryan, and Jack Plotnick, who spoofs the kind of role Chet Stratton played in Lover Come Back.

Typical of the genre, the film tells the story of a woman who advocates female independence in combat with a lothario; the plot reflects the attitudes and behaviour of the early pre-sexual revolution 1960s but has an anachronistic conclusion driven by more modern, post-feminist ideas and attitudes.

Plot

In 1962, aspiring author Barbara Novak arrives in New York to submit her book, Down with Love to Banner House publishing. It is about freeing women from love, enjoying sex without commitment, and replacing the need for a man with things such as chocolate. Barbara believes her rules will help boost women in the workplace and the world in general. 

When Banner House's male executives reject the book, Vikki Hiller, Barbara's editor, suggests Barbara meet with Catcher Block—a successful writer for Know magazine and a notorious ladies' man—to help promote the book. However, Catcher repeatedly avoids meeting Barbara until, fed up, she insults him. Catcher's boss and best friend, Peter MacMannus, and Vikki develop a mutual attraction, but neither is brave enough to express their feelings. Peter feels overshadowed by Catcher's strong personality, and Vikki wants to see strength in her lover, even assuming Peter must be gay.

Barbara and Vikki persuade Judy Garland to sing "Down with Love" on The Ed Sullivan Show to promote the book. Sales skyrocket, as women around the world rebel against their men; Catcher now wants to meet Barbara but she rejects him. The breaking point comes as Barbara appears on a national TV show and discusses a chapter from her book—"The Worst Kind of Man"—and cites Catcher Block as the perfect example, causing the women he dates to reject him.

Catcher schemes to prove Barbara really wants love and marriage like every other woman. He poses as Major Zip Martin, a polite and attentive astronaut. Barbara is immediately infatuated with a man who seems unaware of her celebrity, in contrast to the men who now avoid her since her book was published. As "Zip" takes her to fashionable New York locations, he maintains sexual tension by feigning naivete and a desire to remain chaste until he is "ready" for a physical relationship. His plan becomes complicated after he starts falling for her.

When Barbara encounters Catcher/Zip at a party, which nearly exposes his true identity, he decides to take things to the next level. He tells her Catcher Block wants to interview him for an exposé on the NASA space program and asks her to be there. At his apartment, he sets everything up to record her saying she loves him. Just as they are about to have sex, one of his lovers, Gwendolyn, walks in. Not knowing who Barbara is, she exposes Catcher's identity, forcing him to confess to Barbara. 

Barbara then reveals she is actually Nancy Brown, one of Catcher's many former secretaries, who'd fallen love with him whilst working at Know. She had turned down a date with him, refusing to be another fling. She wanted to be different from the other women he knew, and make him fall in love with her. Catcher proclaims he wants to marry her, but Gwendolyn, having overheard Barbara Novak's name, thanks her for what she has done for womankind. 

Barbara realizes she does not want love or Catcher, as she has become a real "down with love" girl. Vikki and Peter's relationship also changes when she insults him for helping Catcher. Peter says he is indeed like any other man, and takes Vikki to Catcher's apartment to have passionate sex with her.

Days later, Catcher is completely depressed and has failed to win back Barbara. Even his exposé, which he wrote on how falling in love with her made him a better man, is ruined now that Barbara has told her story in her own magazine, Now. Catcher goes to Now on the pretense of a job interview. He tells Barbara how much she has changed him and wishes there could be a middle ground for them, somewhere between her confident blonde persona and her original brunette self. After he leaves her office, she surprises him on the elevator, showing him a bright red hair style. She has found the middle ground and wants to be with him. They elope to Las Vegas, inspiring Vikki and Peter to also get married.

The end credits show Barbara and Catcher's marriage has resulted in a new book aimed at ending the battle of the sexes. The pair sing "Here's to Love".

Cast

Style
The sets, costumes, cinematography, editing, score, opening credits, and visual effects (including split-screen shots during phone calls heavily laced with double entendres between the two leads), echo the style of Hollywood sex comedies from 1959 to 1964 (from Pillow Talk to Sex and the Single Girl). The New York City skyline of 1962 was digitally recreated for backdrops. A greenscreen technique was used to simulate unconvincing 1960s rear projection using restored street footage from the late 1950s and early 1960s. The film begins with the 1960s logos for 20th Century Fox and for CinemaScope, a wide-screen process introduced in the 1950s, developed and owned by 20th Century Fox, with the 1998 version of the fanfare, composed by Alfred Newman. The Regency Enterprises logo is in pink, and contains a saxophone jazz rendition of its theme.

Reception

Box office
Down with Love was chosen as "the perfect film" to open the second Tribeca Film Festival where it made its premiere. The film opened first in New York, and was released country wide a week later May 16, 2003. The film was released as counter programming against The Matrix Reloaded. The film performed worse than expected, earning $40 million at the international box office.

Critical response
At the time of its release, Down With Love received extremely varying reviews. Chicago Sun-Times critic Roger Ebert spoke of the film fairly positively, saying parts were "fun" and describing Zellweger's speech at the end as "a torrent of words [pouring] out from her character's innermost soul". A. O. Scott in The New York Times praised director "Reed's buoyant homage," Zellweger's Doris Day-like ability to "swivel engagingly between goofiness and sex appeal", McGregor's Sinatra-like "wiry, wolfish energy" and screenwriters Ahlert's and Drake's "canny cocktail of period vernacular and deliberately labored double entendres", finding the movie "intelligent and amusing" with "a glorious, hectic artificiality". But he questioned "the point of the exercise" compared to Todd Haynes' Far from Heaven, which "plunged into the subtext of those old movies", whereas Down with Love, being an "updating and a critique", "snips that subtext away", making it "less sophisticated than what it imitates".

Conversely, The San Francisco Chronicle Mick LaSalle wrote "Down With Love is superior to Far From Heaven", which "seems naive in comparison" because "Down with Love is a very smart, very shrewd movie, and the smartest, shrewdest thing about it is the way it masquerades as just a fluffy comedy, a diversion, a trifle. Hardly a trifle, Down With Love distills 40 years of sexual politics into 100 minutes, using the romantic-comedy conventions of an earlier time to comment on the governing social assumptions of yesterday—and today, as well... The brilliance of Down With Love is that it slyly reminds us that our modern perspective, like every 'modern perspective' that preceded it, is doomed to obsolescence and isn't some final stage of enlightened social thought."

Opposing opinions even occurred at the same newspaper, as was the case with The New York Observer, where Rex Reed's review was headlined "Down With Down With Love!" but Andrew Sarris's headline countered with "It's Affectionate and Smart, And I'm Down With Love".

Richard Corliss of Time admired Orlandi's costumes and Laws' design for their "giddily precise exaggeration" and wrote that the script "has a gentle heart to humanize its sharp sitcom wit," advising his readers to "stay for the movie's denouement: a two-minute speech that wraps up the plot like Christmas ribbons around a time bomb". But he found the film to be "miscast at the top" and "conflicted about its subject—it both derides and adores what it means to parody" and that director "Reed often uses a gong where chimes would do." Corliss concludes: "As you see, we too are conflicted about this film. We want to love it, but like a Rock Hudson rake, we keep finding fault in its allure. We want to hate it, but like Doris Day, we finally can't say no".

Nathan Rabin wrote that Chicago critics by and large embraced Down With Love, noting: "It got two thumbs up from Ebert & Roeper and was No. 2 on the Top 10 list of Chicago Reader critic Jonathan Rosenbaum, who called it a "masterpiece" and wrote "If a more interesting and entertaining Hollywood movie than Down with Love has come along this year, I've missed it".

In the years after its release, Rabin and Rosenbaum in an updated piece and Richard Brody at The New Yorker are among the critics and film theorists that have continued to write in praise of the film.

Down with Love current holds a 60% approval rating at review aggregator website Rotten Tomatoes, based on reviews from 179 critics, with an average rating of 6.10/10. The site's consensus states: "Looks great, but Zellweger and McGregor have no chemistry together, and the self-satisfied, knowing tone grates". On Metacritic, the film has a score of 52 out of 100 based on 39 critics' reviews, indicating "mixed or average reviews".

In August 2018 the magazine Vanity Fair put Down With Love at Number 13 on their list of the top "25 Best Romantic Comedies of All Time". In June 2017 Chicago critic Jonathan Rosenbaum named Down With Love one of his "25 Favorite Films of the 21st Century (so far)".

Music
The film's title comes from the song "Down with Love" as sung by Judy Garland, who is seen singing it on The Ed Sullivan Show in one scene.

The song "Here's to Love" sung by Zellweger and McGregor during the closing credits (and in its entirety on the DVD release as a special feature) was a last-minute addition to the film. Songwriters Marc Shaiman and Scott Wittman appear in the number as the bartender and the pianist. According to the DVD commentary, it was added at the suggestion of McGregor, who pointed out the opportunity the filmmakers had to unite the stars of two recently popular musical films (his Moulin Rouge! and Zellweger's Chicago).

The songs "Kissing a Fool" and "For Once in My Life", sung by Michael Bublé, previously appeared on Bublé's 2003 self-titled album.

Track listing

References

External links

 
 
 

2003 films
2003 romantic comedy films
2000s English-language films
2000s historical comedy films
2000s historical romance films
2000s satirical films
American historical comedy films
American historical romance films
American romantic comedy films
American satirical films
English-language German films
Films about writers
Films directed by Peyton Reed
Films scored by Marc Shaiman
Films set in 1962
Films set in New York City
Films shot in Los Angeles
German historical comedy films
German historical romance films
German romantic comedy films
German satirical films
Regency Enterprises films
Films produced by Bruce Cohen
2000s American films
2000s German films